Mink Lake is an unincorporated place and former railway point in geographic Pentland Township in the Unorganized South Part of Nipissing District in northeastern Ontario, Canada. Mink Lake is located within Algonquin Provincial Park at the eastern end of Mink Lake in the Amable du Fond River drainage basin.

It lies on the now abandoned Canadian National Railway Alderdale Subdivision, a section of track that was originally constructed as the Canadian Northern Railway main line, between Ascalon to the west and Daventry to the east.

References

Other map sources:

Communities in Nipissing District